Signe Kallesøe Bruun (born 6 April 1998) is a Danish professional footballer who plays as a striker for French Division 1 Féminine club Lyon and the Denmark national team.

Club career
Bruun joined Fortuna Hjørring from IK Skovbakken in 2014. She made her Fortuna debut on 16 August 2014 and scored twice in a 5–1 Elitedivisionen win over Vejle. On 8 November 2014, Bruun made her UEFA Women's Champions League debut as a 74th minute substitute for Nadia Nadim in a 2–1 round of 16 defeat to Swedish team FC Rosengård. In 2016, Bruun won the 2015–16 Elitedivisionen and Danish Women's Cup double with Fortuna.

On 31 August 2018, Fortuna confirmed the transfer of Bruun to French D1 Féminine club Paris Saint-Germain. In her debut season, Bruun made 17 appearances in all competitions, scoring four goals. In June 2019, Bruun suffered an ACL injury that kept her out for a year. She made her competitive comeback in the delayed Coupe de France semi-final on 2 August 2020, scoring an 84th minute winner in a 2–1 win against Bordeaux. Seven days later she appeared as a substitute in the cup final against Lyon. The game finished goalless after extra-time. Bruun scored during the penalty shootout but PSG lost 4–3. Later that month, Bruun appeared as a 74th minute substitute during the delayed 2019–20 UEFA Women's Champions League quarter-final against Arsenal. She scored three minutes later, the winning goal in the single-legged 2–1 win. The following season, Bruun won the 2020–21 Division 1 Féminine title with PSG, the club's first league title, ending Lyon's 14-year streak at the top in the process.

In June 2021, Bruun joined Lyon.

On 27 January 2022, Bruun made a deadline day move to English FA Women's Super League club Manchester United on loan for the remainder of the 2021–22 season. The spell was marred by injury, limiting Bruun to seven appearances in all competitions in which she failed to score a goal for the club.

International career

Youth
Bruun played as a youth international for Denmark at under-16, under-17, under-19 and under-23 level. She finished as top scorer during 2015 UEFA Women's Under-17 Championship qualification, scoring 10 overall. The total included eight in a qualifying round match against Kazakhstan on 18 October 2014. It equalled the competition record for goals in a single match set by Vivianne Miedema against the same opposition in 2012. In 2015, having scored in three matches during qualifying, Bruun was selected to represent Denmark at the 2015 UEFA Women's Under-19 Championship held in Israel. She appeared in all three matches as Denmark were eliminated at the group stage.

Senior
On 24 October 2017, Bruun debuted for the senior Denmark national team in a 2019 FIFA Women's World Cup qualifier against Croatia. She entered play two minutes into stoppage time as a substitute for Nadia Nadim and scored her first goal two minutes later in Denmark's 4–0 victory. In 2021, Bruun went on a run of scoring in six consecutive matches for Denmark, scoring 12 goals in total all during 2023 FIFA Women's World Cup qualification.

Personal life
In August 2021, Bruun joined a FIFPro 10-year research project tracking players' physical and mental wellbeing.

Career statistics

Club

International

International goals
Scores and results list Denmark's goal tally first. Score column indicates score after each Bruun goal.

Honours

Club
Fortuna Hjørring
 Elitedivisionen: 2015–16, 2017–18
 Danish Women's Cup: 2016

Paris Saint-Germain
 Division 1 Féminine: 2020–21

Lyon
 UEFA Women's Champions League: 2021–22

Individual
 Danish Breakthrough Player of the Year: 2017
 Danish Football Player of the Year: 2021

References

External links
 
 
 Profile at the Danish Football Association website

1998 births
Living people
People from Randers
Danish women's footballers
Women's association football forwards
Denmark women's international footballers
Fortuna Hjørring players
Elitedivisionen players
Danish expatriate women's footballers
Danish expatriate sportspeople in France
Expatriate women's footballers in France
Paris Saint-Germain Féminine players
Division 1 Féminine players
Olympique Lyonnais Féminin players
Danish expatriate sportspeople in England
Expatriate women's footballers in England
Manchester United W.F.C. players
Women's Super League players
Sportspeople from the Central Denmark Region
UEFA Women's Euro 2022 players
Association football forwards
Denmark international footballers
Denmark women's youth international footballers